Morva Hadaf is one of the 182 Legislative Assembly constituencies of Gujarat state in India. It is part of Panchmahal district and is reserved for candidates belonging to the Scheduled Tribes. The seat was formed after the delimitation exercise of 2008 and is a part of Panchmahal Lok Sabha constituency.

List of segments
This assembly seat represents the following segments,

 Morva (Hadaf) Taluka
 Santrampur Taluka (Part) Villages – Sandh Paliya, Thambha, Mankodiya, Kalibel Navaghara, Kalibel, Padhariya, Kanbina Moyla, Godhar (West), Chunthana Muvada, Manchod, Rafai, Bahediya, Nasikpur, Barela, Moyala Pad, Vaghan, Dhamotna Moyla, Anjanwa, Charada, Vaghfal, Nan Salai, Rambhemna Muvada, Panchmuva, Vankdi, Vandariya (West), Kenpur, Singalgadh, Umber, Shir, Motirel (West), Vena, Ora, Jotangiya, Ambaliyat, Satkunda, Sarasva (West), Nanirel (West), Doli, Gadiya, Babri, Amba, Jaldada, Limdi
 Godhra Taluka (Part) Villages – Bhamaiya, Sarsav, Mirap, Dahikot, Gollav
 Devgad Baria Taluka (Part) of Dahod District Village – Gamdi

Members of Legislative Assembly

^ : (By-election)

Election results

2022

2021

2017

2013

2012

See also
 List of constituencies of the Gujarat Legislative Assembly
 Panchmahal district

References

External links
 

Assembly constituencies of Gujarat
Panchmahal district